is a railway station in the city of Nagaoka, Niigata, Japan, operated by East Japan Railway Company (JR East).

Lines
Oshikiri Station is served by the Shin'etsu Main Line and is 79.9 kilometers from the terminus of the line at Naoetsu Station.

Station layout
The station consists of two ground-level opposed side platforms connected by a footbridge, serving two tracks. The station is unattended.

Platforms

History
Oshikiri Station opened on 1 September 1901. With the privatization of Japanese National Railways (JNR) on 1 April 1987, the station came under the control of JR East. The station building dates from 1995.

Surrounding area
Shingumi Elementary School

See also
 List of railway stations in Japan

External links

 JR East station information 

Railway stations in Nagaoka, Niigata
Railway stations in Japan opened in 1901
Shin'etsu Main Line
Stations of East Japan Railway Company